Secuieni may refer to:

 Secuieni, Bacău, a commune in Bacău County, Romania
 Secuieni, Harghita, a commune in Harghita County, Romania
 Secuieni, Neamț, a commune in Neamţ County, Romania
 Roman-Secuieni gas field, Romania

See also
 Székely (disambiguation)